New York State Route 336 (NY 336) is an east–west state highway located within Seneca County in the Finger Lakes region of New York in the United States. The section of NY 336 that runs along the town line is known as Townline Road. NY 336 was assigned to its current alignment in the early 1930s.

Route description
NY 336 begins at an intersection with NY 96A in a rural, open area of the town of Fayette. The two-lane route heads to the southeast, passing a small number of commercial buildings on the corner of the junction before heading across rolling, undeveloped terrain. At this point, NY 336 becomes known as Townline Road as it turns east to run along the town line. It passes a handful of isolated homes on its way to the hamlet of MacDougall, a small community built up around the junction of NY 336 and MacDougall Road (CR 121).

From here, the route crosses an old railroad grade and Kendig Creek on its way to a signalled intersection with NY 96. East of NY 96, the highway continues across largely open areas of Fayette and Varick, serving little more than farms and the occasional house as it heads along the town line. NY 336 eventually reaches the outskirts of the hamlet of Fayette, where it ends at an intersection with NY 414 (Main Street) at the south end of the village's main north–south residential strip. At this point, the Fayette–Varick town line turns north to follow NY 414 for a half-mile (0.8 km) before resuming its easterly trek across the county.

History
On November 5, 1920, the state of New York awarded a contract to rebuild the Fayette–Varick town line road between MacDougall and what is now NY 96. The highway cost $51,139 to reconstruct (equivalent to $ in ), and it was added to the state highway system on October 31, 1921. The  section west of MacDougall became state-maintained in the mid-1920s when the state assumed maintenance of a  road connecting MacDougall to the Seneca River at East Geneva. The new state road curved northwest from the town line for a short distance before heading north toward East Geneva on modern NY 96A.

In the 1930 renumbering of state highways in New York, hundreds of state-maintained roads were given signed numbers for the first time. The new route utilized the state-owned section of the Fayette–Varick town line road and the small section of the MacDougall–East Geneva road that curved into Fayette. The segment of NY 336 east of NY 15 (NY 96) was accepted into the state highway system in the early 1930s.

By the mid-1960s, the NY 96–NY 336 intersection had become prone to frequent accidents, some of which were fatal. The rash of incidents was attributed to steep grades on NY 336 that created a poor sight line for drivers heading east toward NY 96. A four-way flashing traffic light was also installed at the junction as part of the project. In early 2013 a three-color signal was installed at the intersection, going into operation on May 20.

Major intersections

See also

References

External links

336
Transportation in Seneca County, New York